Nlaza of Kongo was a manikongo from the Lukeni kanda dynasty and the 3rd ruler of the Central African kingdom of Kongo in the early 15th century. Little is known about him or his reign other than he was one of two cousins of Kongo's founder, Lukeni lua Nimi.

He and Quinanga of Kongo were kings between Lukeni lua Nimi, the first king, and Nkuwu a Ntinu, the fourth.

See also
Kingdom of Kongo
List of rulers of Kongo

References

Kongolese royalty
Manikongo of Kongo
15th-century monarchs in Africa